Parasteatoda tabulata is a cobweb spider first described by female found by  H. W. Levi in 1980. It originates from tropical Asia, but has been introduced to North America, Europe, and temperate Asia including China, Korea, and Japan.

References

External links
NCBI Taxonomy Browser, Parasteatoda tabulata

Theridiidae
Spiders described in 1980